Aoife Neary (born 1985) is a camogie player and works as a vascular physiologist in the south east. She lives in County Kilkenny. Winner of All Star awards in 2008 and 2009. Neary played in the All-Ireland Senior Camogie Championship 2009 and again in 2013. Her father, Paddy, was a corner-back with Kilkenny in the early 1980s and went on to serve as an inter-county referee, while her aunt, Catherine Neary, is the Camogie Association president. Aoife Neary won a National League medal in 2008. Neary was on the Junior All-Ireland winning side of 2002 and holds Leinster titles in the Under-14 (two), Under-16 (three), Minor (three), Junior and Senior (three) grades. She has captured Gael Linn Cup Junior and Senior honours with Leinster, Under-16 (two), Junior and Minor titles with her club, and an All-Ireland Senior 'B' Colleges medal.

References

External links 
 Official Camogie Website
 Kilkenny Camogie Website
 All-Ireland Senior Camogie Championship: Roll of Honour
 Report of All Ireland final in Irish Times Independent and Examiner

1985 births
Living people
Kilkenny camogie players